Joy Marie Burch is an Australian politician and the current Speaker of the Australian Capital Territory Legislative Assembly. She has been a Labor Party member for the seat of Brindabella in the ACT Legislative Assembly since the 2008 ACT election.

Biography
Prior to being elected to the Legislative Assembly, Burch was a registered nurse. She worked for several years as a community nurse across southern NSW and the ACT.

Burch lived for several years in Alice Springs, as the Executive Director of the Australian Rural Health Education Network, as Executive Director of the Northern Territory Remote Workforce Agency and as the CEO of the Rural Health and Community Support Services. She also was the owner and operator of a Childcare Centre.

Burch has formal tertiary education, with a Bachelor of Arts in Liberal Studies, and Post-Graduate qualifications in Health Administration and Information Systems Management.

Burch is married with three sons and lives in Tuggeranong. Her hobbies include spending time with her family, community events and volunteering, swimming, gardening, walking, reading, and listening to music.

Political career
Burch was first elected to the Australian Capital Territory Legislative Assembly in the Brindabella electorate at the 2008 election. Upon entering the Assembly, Burch was appointed Government Whip, Assistant Speaker and ALP Caucus Secretary.

A year later, Burch was appointed to Cabinet. Over the next seven years, she held a number of Ministerial positions, including:
•	Minister for Education and Training (November 2012 – January 2016)
•	Minister for Police and Emergency Services (December 2014 – December 2015)
•	Minister for Disability (November 2012 – January 2016)
•	Minister for Racing and Gaming (May 2011 – January 2016)
•	Minister for Arts (May 2011 – January 2016)
•	Minister for Aboriginal and Torres Strait Islanders Affairs (May 2011 – October 2012)
•	Minister for Ageing (November 2009 – October 2012) 
•	Minister for Children and Young People (November 2012 – July 2014)
•	Minister for Community Services (November 2009 – October 2012)
•	Minister for Multicultural Affairs (November 2009 – January 2015)
•	Minister for Women (November 2009 – January 2015)

She was re-elected at the 2012 election.

Burch faced controversy when it was alleged that her chief of staff briefed the Construction, Forestry, Maritime, Mining and Energy Union (CFMEU) on matters regarding ACT Policing which are still under investigation. She resigned as Minister for Police and Emergency Services in December 2015 before resigning from all other ministerial positions a month later in January 2016. She then became Deputy Speaker and Government Whip.

Burch was again re-elected at the 2016 election, and was subsequently elected Speaker of the ACT Legislative Assembly. and she was elected Speaker of the Australian Capital Territory Legislative Assembly.

Burch was again re-elected at the 2020 Australian Capital Territory general election, receiving the highest vote of any candidate in the Brindabella Electorate, and obtaining a significant swing towards her. She was re-elected Speaker of the ACT Legislative Assembly for the tenth parliament.

References

Australian Labor Party members of the Australian Capital Territory Legislative Assembly
Living people
Members of the Australian Capital Territory Legislative Assembly
21st-century Australian politicians
21st-century Australian women politicians
Year of birth missing (living people)
Women members of the Australian Capital Territory Legislative Assembly
Women legislative speakers